Ampelomyia vitispomum is a species of gall midge in the family Cecidomyiidae. It induces galls on grape plants in eastern North America. It was first described by Carl Robert Osten-Sacken in 1878.

References

Cecidomyiinae
Insects described in 1878
Taxa named by Carl Robert Osten-Sacken
Gall-inducing insects
Diptera of North America
Articles created by Qbugbot